This article lists the results for the Wales national football team from 2000 through to 2019.

2000s

2000

2001

2002

2003

2004

2005

2006

2007

2008

2009

2010s

2010

2011

2012

2013

2014

2015

2016

2017

2018

2019

Head-to-head records

 P – Played; W – Won; D – Drawn; L – Lost

See also
2002 FIFA World Cup qualification
2006 FIFA World Cup qualification
2010 FIFA World Cup qualification
2014 FIFA World Cup qualification
2018 FIFA World Cup qualification
UEFA Euro 2004 qualifying
UEFA Euro 2008 qualifying
UEFA Euro 2012 qualifying
UEFA Euro 2016 qualifying
Nations Cup (football)

References

Bibliography

External links 
 RSSSF: Wales – International Results

2000s in Wales
2010s in Wales
2000s
1999–2000 in Welsh football
2000–01 in Welsh football
2001–02 in Welsh football
2002–03 in Welsh football
2003–04 in Welsh football
2004–05 in Welsh football
2005–06 in Welsh football
2006–07 in Welsh football
2007–08 in Welsh football
2008–09 in Welsh football
2009–10 in Welsh football
2010–11 in Welsh football
2011–12 in Welsh football
2012–13 in Welsh football
2013–14 in Welsh football
2014–15 in Welsh football
2015–16 in Welsh football
2016–17 in Welsh football
2017–18 in Welsh football
2018–19 in Welsh football
2019–20 in Welsh football